At the End of Paths Taken is the tenth studio album by the Canadian alt-country band Cowboy Junkies, released in 2007.

Track listing

Reception 
Per PopMatters, the album's emphasis is on family. The musicians are at the point in their lives where their time is divided between their children and their aging parents. One example of At the End of Paths Taken showcasing family is by having the Timmins' father narrate a segment from his book on "Mountain". Per No Depression,  the album does not have a coherent style, with lilting ballads, junkyard clang, gloomy experimentalism, folk, and hymn-like music. Despite the disparate styles, the album is held together by the distinctive voice of Margo Timmins, and somehow the different styles feed off each other, making the album feel like a full and fated journey. Per exclaim!, the album's theme is of slowly unravelling family ties. Margo's voice continues to be the centerpiece of the sound, but on this album it is augmented by the addition of strings to make the sound even more melancholy.

Personnel 
Cowboy Junkies
Margo Timmins – vocals
Michael Timmins – guitar, backing vocals
Alan Anton – bass, percussion, keyboards
Peter Timmins – drums, percussion, congas

Additional musicians
Jeff Bird – percussion, electronic mandolin
Joby Baker – piano, keyboards, bass
Henry Kucharczyk – digital kalimba, string arrangement & conducting
Benjamine Bowman, Sandra Baron, Rebecca Vanderpost, Sarah Fraser-Raff – violin
Amy Laing, Richard Armin – cello
The Sara J. Ratzlaff / Madeleine Wiener Youth Choir – choir (track 11)
John A.Timmins – narration (track 10) – read from his book I Don't Know Where I Am But I'm Making Good Time

Production
Michael Timmins – producer, engineer
Peter Moore – mastering
Ian Bodzasi – recorded by (strings)
Jeff Wolpert – mixing (tracks 1, 3, 4, 7, 11)
Joby Backer – supplemental recorded by, mixing (tracks 2, 5, 6, 8 – 10)
Matt Evees – assistant
David Houghton – cover concept, art direction
Alice Phieu – art direction assist, cover concept
Angus MacPherson – cover photo

References

External links 

2007 albums
Cowboy Junkies albums
Latent Recordings albums